Protozoan infections are parasitic diseases caused by organisms formerly classified in the kingdom Protozoa. They are usually contracted by either an insect vector or by contact with an infected substance or surface and include organisms that are now classified in the supergroups Excavata, Amoebozoa, SAR, and Archaeplastida.

Protozoan infections are responsible for diseases that affect many different types of organisms, including plants, animals, and some marine life. Many of the most prevalent and deadly human diseases are caused by a protozoan infection, including African sleeping sickness, amoebic dysentery, and malaria.

The species originally termed "protozoa" are not closely related to each other and only have superficial similarities (eukaryotic, unicellular, motile, though with exceptions). The terms "protozoa" (and protist) are usually discouraged in the modern biosciences. However, this terminology is still encountered in medicine. This is partially because of the conservative character of medical classification and partially due to the necessity of making identifications of organisms based upon morphology.

Within the taxonomic classification, the four protist supergroups (Amoebozoa, Excavata, SAR, and Archaeplastida) fall under the domain Eukarya. Protists are an artificial grouping of over 64,000 different single-celled life forms. This means that it is difficult to define protists due to their extreme differences and uniqueness. Protists are a polyphyletic [(of a group of organisms) derived from more than one common evolutionary ancestor or ancestral group and therefore not suitable for placing in the same taxon] a collection of organisms and they are unicellular, which means that they lack the level of tissue organization which is present in more complex eukaryotes. Protists grow in a wide variety of moist habitats and a majority of them are free-living organisms. In these moist environments, plankton and terrestrial forms can also be found. Protists are chemoorganotrophic [organisms which oxidize the chemical bonds in organic compounds as their energy source] and are responsible for recycling nitrogen and phosphorus. Parasites also are responsible for causing disease in humans and domesticated animals.

Protozoa are chemoorganotrophic protists and have three different ways of acquiring nutrients. The first method of acquiring nutrients is through saprotrophic nutrition. In saprotrophic nutrition, nutrients are obtained from dead organic matter through enzymatic degradation. The second method of acquiring nutrients is through osmotrophic nutrition. In osmotrophic nutrition, nutrients are obtained through absorbing soluble products. The third method of acquiring nutrients is through holozoic nutrition. In holozoic nutrition, solid nutrients are absorbed through phagocytosis.

Some protozoa are photoautotrophic protists. These protists include strict aerobes, and use photosystems I and II in order to carry out photosynthesis which produces oxygen.

Mixotrophic protists obtain nutrients through organic and inorganic carbon compounds simultaneously.

All cells have a plasma membrane. In a protist, the plasma membrane is also known as the plasmalemma. Just below the plasma membrane, and in the inner fluid region, cytoplasm can be found. The pellicle structure in the protist is a thin layer of protein that helps provide the cell with some support and protection.  In addition to the plasma membrane, protists contain two different types of vacuoles. Contractile vacuoles help to maintain osmoregulation, and phagocytic vacuoles allow select protists to ingest food. In some protists, flagella or cilia may be present to help with motility and nutrient intake. The flagella or cilia create water currents that assist in feeding and respiration. Energy intake is necessary for protists’ survival. Aerobic chemoorganotrophic protists produce energy through the use of their mitochondria. The mitochondria then generate energy for the protist to keep up with cellular life functions. Photosynthetic protists produce energy through the use of their mitochondria and chloroplasts. Finally, anaerobic chemoorganotrophs produce energy through the use of hydrogenosomes, which are membrane-enclosed organelles that release molecular hydrogen (H2).

Encystment is when a protist becomes a dormant cyst with a cell wall; during encystment, the cyst has decreased complexity and metabolic activity relative to the protist. Encystment protects the protist from environmental changes, the cyst can be a site for nuclear reorganization and cell division, and it can act as a host cell in order to transfer parasitic species. Excystment is when a return to favorable conditions may cause a cyst to return to its original state. In parasitic protists, excystment may occur when the cyst is ingested by a new host.

Protists reproduce asexually or sexually. If the protists reproduce asexually, they do so through binary fission, multiple fission, budding, and fragmentation. If the protists reproduce sexually, they do so through a syngamy process where there is a fusion of the gametes. If this occurs in an individual it is recognized as autogamy. If this occurs between individuals, it is known as conjugation.

Supergroup Excavata
Excavata are considered primitive eukaryotes. They are characterized by a feeding groove with a posteriorly located flagella, which allows them to create a current that captures small food particles. The cytostome is the specialized structure that allows the protists this function. This supergroup Excavata includes the subgroups Diplomonads (Fornicata), Parabasalids, and Euglenozoans.

Diplomonads 
Diplomonads used to be defined as Fornicata, but their characteristics remain the same despite their renaming. They are microaerophilic protists. Diplomonads were previously defined by the lack of a mitochondrion, but recent studies have found that they have a nonfunctional, mitochondrial remnant organelle called a mitosome. Most are harmless except for Giardia, Hexamita salmonis, and Histomonas meleagridis. Giardia causes diarrhea, Hexamita salmonis is a fish parasite, and Histomonas meleagridis is a turkey pathogen.

Giardia intestinalis is a human pathogen, which is transmitted by cyst-contaminated water. It causes epidemic diarrhea from contaminated water. One can tell one may be infected by the observation of cysts or trophozoites in stools and ELISA (enzyme-linked immunosorbent assay) test. To prevent contamination, avoid any possibly contaminated water, and if contaminated water is the only thing available to drink, a slow sand filter should be used. A study found that the chlorination of water and nutritional intervention had no effect on childhood giardia infection. Only handwashing and hygienic sanitation interventions reduced infection rates in children.

Hexamita salmonis is a common flagellated fish pathogen. Infected fish are weak and emaciated, and typically swim on their sides.

Histomonas meleagridis is a common bird pathogen that causes histomoniasis. Signs of histomoniasis include reduced appetite, drooping wings, unkempt feathers, and yellow fecal droppings.

Parabasilia 
Most Parabasalia are flagellated endosymbionts of animals. They lack a distinct cytostome, which means they must use phagocytosis to engulf food. There are two subgroups: Trichonympha and Trichomonadida. Trichonympha are obligate mutualists of wood-eating insects such as termites. They secrete cellulase, which is used for digesting wood. The next subgroup, Trichomonadida, does not require oxygen and possesses hydrogenosomes. They only reproduce through asexual reproduction and some strains are human pathogens. There are three types of pathogenic parabasalia: Trichomonas foetus, Dientamoeba fragilis, and Trichomonas vaginalis. Trichomonas foetus causes spontaneous abortion in cattle, Dientamoeba fragilis causes diarrhea in humans, and Trichomonas vaginalis is a sexually transmitted disease.

Trichomonas foetus is a parasite that resides in the urogenital tract of cattle and causes bovine trichomoniasis. Trichomoniasis is a sexually transmitted disease that causes infertility in heifers. Most infertility is caused by sudden embryonic death. Various imidazoles have been used to treat infected bulls, but none are safe and effective. Ipronidazole is probably most effective but it frequently causes sterile abscesses at injection sites.

Dientamoeba fragilis is a parasite that lives in the large intestine of humans. No one knows how D. fragilis is spread; one possibility is from swallowing contaminated water or food. Many people who are infected with this parasite show no signs of being infected. Sometimes the infection can be observed; the most common symptoms include diarrhea, stomach pains, loss of appetite, nausea, and fatigue.

Trichomonas vaginalis is a sexually transmitted disease. Men who are infected rarely show any symptoms (asymptomatic). Women who are infected usually show signs of soreness, inflammation, and redness around the vagina and a possible change in vaginal discharge. Trichomonas vaginalis can be treated with a course of antibiotics.

Euglenozoa 
Most Euglenozoa are photoautotrophic, but some are chemoorganotrophs (saprophytic). They are commonly found in freshwater. The members of the phylum Euglenozoa have a pellicle for support, a red eye spot called a stigma to orient the cell toward light, chlorophyll a and b to assist in the process of photosynthesis, contractile vacuoles, and flagella.

One major pathogen from the phylum Euglenozoa is Leishmania. Leishmania causes leishmaniasis. The symptoms of leishmaniasis include systemic and skin/membrane damage. Leishmania parasites spread by phlebotomine sand flies in the tropics, subtropics, and southern Europe. They may manifest cutaneously (cutaneous leishmaniasis) as skin sores with as scab a few weeks after the bite or internally (visceral leishmaniasis), affecting the organs, which can be life-threatening. Cutaneous leishmaniasis can spread to the mucus membranes and cause mucosal leishmaniasis even years after the initial infection. Cutaneous leishmaniasis heals on its own and leaves bad scars. Only FDA approved for visceral leishmaniasis is amphotericin B and oral miltefosine for cutaneous and mucosal leishmaniasis diagnosis- tissue specimen, bone marrow, blood tests detect antibody to parasite for visceral leishmaniasis.

The second pathogen from this phylum is Trypanosoma cruzi. Trypanosoma cruzi causes Chagas disease and is transmitted by the reduviid bug, also known as the “kissing bug.”  Chagas disease is diagnosed using a physical exam and blood test. The only treatment includes antiparasitics only from the CDC, which are not FDA approved. Acute Chagas disease has a quick onset, the trypanosomes enter the bloodstream, they become amastigotes, and replicate. Acute Chagas disease can be treated using benznidazole or nifurtimox. Chronic chagas disease is asymptomatic and causes heart and gastrointestinal cells to be affected. Currently, there are only investigational treatments for this disease. Unfortunately, vaccines are not effective with Chagas disease due to antigenic variation. This pathogen causes damage to the nervous system.

African Sleeping Sickness is caused by Trypanosoma brucei rhodensiense and Trypanosoma brucei gambiense, and is transmitted by the tsetse fly. It is diagnosed by a physical exam and blood test.  African sleeping sickness causes interstitial inflammation, lethargy, brain swelling, and death within one to three years. Drug therapy, using Eflornithine and Melarsoprol Pentamidine for T. gambiense and Suramin (Antrypol) for either Trypanosoma brucei rhodensiense and Trypanosoma brucei gambiense, or combinations of these medications, can help treat this disease, but vaccines can not be used due to antigenic variation.

Supergroup Amoebozoa

Amoebozoa are characterized by the use of pseudopodia for movement and feeding. These protists reproduce by binary or multiple fission.

Entamoebida 
Entamoebida lack mitochondria and possess mitosomes. Entamoeba histolytica is a pathogenic parasite known to cause amoebiasis, which is the third leading cause of parasitic deaths. It is diagnosed by the assessment of stool samples. Amoebiasis is caused by the ingestion of food or water contaminated with feces or other bodily wastes of an infected person, which contain cysts, the dormant form of the microbe. These cysts on reaching the terminal ileum region of the gastrointestinal tract give rise to a mass of proliferating cells, the trophozoite form of the parasite, by the process of excystation. Symptoms of this infection include diarrhea with blood and mucus, and can alternate between constipation and remission, abdominal pain, and fever. Symptoms can progress to ameboma, fulminant colitis, toxic megacolon, colonic ulcers, leading to perforation, and abscesses in vital organs like liver, lung, and brain. Amoebiasis can be treated with the administration of anti-amoebic compounds, this often includes the use of Metronidazole, Ornidazole, Chloroquine, Secnidazole, Nitazoxanide and Tinidazole. Tinidazole may be effective in curing children. The usage of conventional therapeutics to treat amoebiasis if often linked with substantial side effects, a threat to the efficacy of these therapeutics, further worsened by the development of drug resistance in the parasite. Amoebic meningoencephalitis and keratitis is a brain-eating amoeba caused by free-living Naeglaria and Acanthomoeba. One way this pathogen can be acquired is by soaking contact lenses in water instead of contact solution. This will result in progressive ulceration of the cornea. This pathogen can be diagnosed by demonstration of amoebae in clinical specimens. There is currently no drug therapy available for amoebic meningoencephalitis and keratitis.

Supergroup SAR 
The supergroup SAR includes Stramenopiles, Alveolata and Rhizaria, and is distinguished by fine pseudopodia which can be branched, simple, or connected.

Stramenopila 
Some members of Stramenopila are brown algae, diatoms, and water molds. An example of Stramenopila are Peronosporomycetes. The most well-known example of Peronosporomycetes is Phytophthora infestans. This organism caused the Great Famine of Ireland in the 1850s.

Alveolata 
Alveolata is a large group, which includes Dinoflagellata, Ciliophora, and Apicomplexa.

Balantidium Coli (Balantidiasis) is an example of a member of the phylum Ciliophora. Balantidiasis is the only ciliate known to be capable of infecting humans, and swine are the primary reservoir host. Balantidiasis is opportunistic and rare in Western countries. Apicomplexans are parasites of animals and contain an arrangement of organelles called the apical complex. One example of an apicomplexan is Malaria. Five species of plasmodium cause malaria in animals. Malaria is transmitted by the bite of an infected female mosquito. Symptoms of malaria include: periodic chills and fever, anemia, and hypertrophy of the liver and spleen. Cerebral malaria can occur in children. In order to diagnose Malaria, doctors will look for parasites in Wright-or-Giemsa-stained red blood cells and serological tests. Treatment includes antimalarial drugs, however, resistance has been observed. New vaccines are being discovered to this day. Preventative measures that can be taken include sleeping with netting and using insecticide to prevent mosquitoes. Eimeria is another example of an apicomplexan pathogen. This pathogen causes cecal coccidiosis in chickens. Coccidiosis is a parasitic disease of the intestinal tract. This disease is treated by placing anticoccidials in the chickens’ feed. It also causes malabsorption, diarrhea, and sometimes bloody diarrhea in animals. Theileria parva & T. annulata are tick-borne parasites which cause fatal East Coast fever in cattle. East Coast fever is transmitted by the bite of the three-host tick Phipicephalus appendiculatus and results in respiratory failure and death in African cattle. Most hosts of P. appendiculatus succumb to pulmonary edema and die within three weeks of infection. The severity of the infection can be lessened by treatment with antiprotozoal drugs like buparvaquone. Toxoplasma causes toxoplasmosis and can be acquired from undercooked meat or cat feces containing Toxoplasma gondii. The majority of the 60 million Americans infected with T. gondii are asymptomatic. The group most vulnerable to this pathogen are the fetuses of mothers who have been infected with the parasite for the first time during pregnancy. This can result in damage to the fetus’s brain, eyes, and other organs. Treatment is available for pregnant women and the immunosuppressed. Cryptosporidiosis can be contracted through contact with water, food, soil, or surfaces contaminated with feces containing the Cryptosporidium. Immunocompromised people are the most susceptible. Cryptosporidiosis causes watery diarrhea and can resolve itself without medical intervention. It is diagnosed by examining stool samples, and diarrhea can be treated using Nitazoxanide.

Rhizaria 
Plasmodiophorids and Halosporidians are two examples of parasitic Rhizaria. Plasmodiophorids cause infections in crops such as Spongospora subterranea. They cause powdery scabs and galls and disrupt growth. Halosporidians cause infections in marine invertebrates such as Mikrocytos mackini in Pacific oysters. Mikrocytos mackini are abscesses or green pustules on palps and mantles of certain molluscs.

Archaeplastida 
The supergroup Archaeplastida includes red algae, green algae and land plants. Each of these three groups have multicellular species and the green and red algae have many single-celled species. The land plants are not considered protists.

Red algae are primarily multicellular, lack flagella, and range in size from microscopic, unicellular to large, multicellular forms. Some species of red algae contain phycoerythrins, photosynthetic accessory pigments that are red in color and outcompete the green tint of chlorophyll, making these species appear as varying shades of red. This group doesn’t include many pathogens.

Green algae exhibit similar features to the land plants, particularly in terms of chloroplast structure. The green algae are subdivided into the chlorophytes and charophytes. It is very rare for green algae to become parasitic.

Prototheca moriformis belongs to the subdivision Chloroplastida. P. moriformis is a green algae that lacks chlorophyll and has turned to parasitism. It is found in sewage and the soil. P. moriformis causes a disease called protothecosis. This disease mainly infects cattle and dogs. Cattle can be affected by prototheca enteritis and mastitis. Protothecosis is commonly seen in dogs; it enters the body through the mouth or nose and causes infection in the intestines. Treatment with amphotericin B has been reported.

Future Treatment
Scientists have been researching new ways to fight protozoan infections, including targeting channels and transporters involved in the diseases and finding the link between a persons microbiome and their ability to resist a protozoan infection

Related articles
 Parasitic infection
 Babesiosis
 Giardiasis

References

External links 

Protozoal diseases